Least-squares support-vector machines (LS-SVM) for statistics and in statistical modeling, are least-squares versions of support-vector machines (SVM), which are a set of related supervised learning methods that analyze data and recognize patterns, and which are used for classification and regression analysis.  In this version one finds the solution by solving a set of linear equations instead of a convex quadratic programming (QP) problem for classical SVMs. Least-squares SVM classifiers were proposed by Johan Suykens and Joos Vandewalle. LS-SVMs are a class of kernel-based learning methods.

From support-vector machine to least-squares support-vector machine
Given a training set  with input data  and corresponding binary class labels , the SVM classifier, according to Vapnik's original formulation, satisfies the following conditions:

 

which is equivalent to

 

where  is the nonlinear map from original space to the high- or infinite-dimensional space.

Inseparable data
In case such a separating hyperplane does not exist, we introduce so-called slack variables  such that

 

According to the structural risk minimization principle, the risk bound is minimized by the following minimization problem:

 

 

To solve this problem, we could construct the Lagrangian function:

where  are the Lagrangian multipliers. The optimal point will be in the saddle point of the Lagrangian function, and then we obtain

 

By substituting  by its expression in the Lagrangian formed from the appropriate objective and constraints, we will get the following quadratic programming problem:

 

where  is called the kernel function. Solving this QP problem subject to constraints in (8), we will get the hyperplane in the high-dimensional space and hence the classifier in the original space.

Least-squares SVM formulation
The least-squares version of the SVM classifier is obtained by reformulating the minimization problem as

 

subject to the equality constraints

 

The least-squares SVM (LS-SVM) classifier formulation above implicitly corresponds to a regression interpretation with binary targets .

Using , we have

 

with  Notice, that this error would also make sense for least-squares data fitting, so that the same end results holds for the regression case.

Hence the LS-SVM classifier formulation is equivalent to

 

Both  and  should be considered as hyperparameters to tune the amount of regularization versus the sum squared error. The solution does only depend on the ratio , therefore the original formulation uses only  as tuning parameter.

The solution of LS-SVM regressor will be obtained after we construct the Lagrangian function:

 

where  are the Lagrange multipliers. The conditions for optimality are

 

 

Kernel function K
For the kernel function K(•, •) one typically has the following choices:
 Linear kernel : 
 Polynomial kernel of degree : 
 Radial basis function RBF kernel : 
 MLP kernel : 

The scale parameters ,  and  determine the scaling of the inputs in the polynomial, RBF and MLP kernel function. This scaling is related to the bandwidth of the kernel in statistics, where it is shown that the bandwidth is an important parameter of the generalization behavior of a kernel method.

Bayesian interpretation for LS-SVM
A Bayesian interpretation of the SVM has been proposed by Smola et al.

A general Bayesian evidence framework was developed by MacKay, and MacKay has used it to the problem of regression, forward neural network and classification network. Provided data set , a model  with parameter vector  and a so-called hyperparameter or regularization parameter , Bayesian inference is constructed with 3 levels of inference:

 The third level of inference in the evidence framework ranks different models by examining their posterior probabilities

We can see that Bayesian evidence framework is a unified theory for learning the model and model selection.
Kwok used the Bayesian evidence framework to interpret the formulation of SVM and model selection. And he also applied Bayesian evidence framework to support vector regression.

Applying Bayes’ rule, we obtain

When , the distribution of  will approximate a uniform distribution.

 

We assume that the data points are independently identically distributed (i.i.d.), so that:

 

In order to obtain the least square cost function, it is assumed that the probability of a data point is proportional to:

 

A Gaussian distribution is taken for the errors  as:

 

The projections  of the class elements  follow a multivariate Gaussian distribution, which have variance .

Combining the preceding expressions, and neglecting all constants, Bayes’ rule becomes

 

References

Bibliography
 J. A. K. Suykens, T. Van Gestel, J. De Brabanter, B. De Moor, J. Vandewalle, Least Squares Support Vector Machines, World Scientific Pub. Co., Singapore, 2002. 
 Suykens J. A. K., Vandewalle J., Least squares support vector machine classifiers, Neural Processing Letters, vol. 9, no. 3, Jun. 1999, pp. 293–300.
 Vladimir Vapnik. The Nature of Statistical Learning Theory. Springer-Verlag, 1995. 
 MacKay, D. J. C., Probable networks and plausible predictions—A review of practical Bayesian methods for supervised neural networks. Network: Computation in Neural Systems, vol. 6, 1995, pp. 469–505.

External links
 www.esat.kuleuven.be/sista/lssvmlab/ "Least squares support vector machine Lab (LS-SVMlab) toolbox contains Matlab/C implementations for a number of LS-SVM algorithms".
 www.kernel-machines.org "Support Vector Machines and Kernel based methods (Smola & Schölkopf)".
 www.gaussianprocess.org "Gaussian Processes: Data modeling using Gaussian Process priors over functions for regression and classification (MacKay, Williams)".
 www.support-vector.net "Support Vector Machines and kernel based methods (Cristianini)".
 dlib: Contains a least-squares SVM implementation for large-scale datasets.

Support vector machines
Classification algorithms
Statistical classification
Least squares